Arild Ragnar Holm (born 11 February 1942) is a Norwegian alpine skier. He was born in Stjørdal. He participated at the 1964 Winter Olympics in Innsbruck, where he competed in downhill, slalom and giant slalom.

References

External links

1942 births
Living people
People from Stjørdal
Norwegian male alpine skiers
Olympic alpine skiers of Norway
Alpine skiers at the 1964 Winter Olympics
Sportspeople from Trøndelag